The semiconductor industry is the aggregate of companies engaged in the design and fabrication of semiconductors and semiconductor devices, such as transistors and integrated circuits. It formed around 1960, once the fabrication of semiconductor devices became a viable business. In 2019, 32.4% of the semiconductor market segment was for networks and communications devices.  

In 2021, the sales of semiconductors reached a record $555.9 billion, up 26.2 percent with sales in China reaching $192.5 billion, according to the Semiconductor Industry Association. A record 1.15 trillion semiconductor units were shipped in the calendar year. The semiconductors is projected to reach $ 726.73 billion by 2027.

Industry structure
The global semiconductor industry is dominated by companies from the United States, Taiwan, South Korea, Japan and the Netherlands.

Unique features of the industry include continuous growth but in a cyclical pattern with high volatility. While the current 20 year annual average growth of the semiconductor industry is on the order of 13%, this has been accompanied by equally above-average market volatility, which can lead to significant if not dramatic cyclical swings. This has required the need for high degrees of flexibility and innovation in order to constantly adjust to the rapid pace of change in the market as many products embedding semiconductor devices often have a very short life cycle. 

At the same time, the rate of constant price-performance improvement in the semiconductor industry is staggering. As a consequence, changes in the semiconductor market not only occur extremely rapidly but also anticipate changes in industries evolving at a slower pace. The semiconductor industry is widely recognized as a key driver and technology enabler for the whole electronics value chain.

The industry is based on the foundry model, which consists of semiconductor fabrication plants (foundries) and integrated circuit design operations, each belonging to separate companies or subsidiaries.  Some companies, known as integrated device manufacturers, both design and manufacture semiconductors. The foundry model has resulted in consolidation among foundries. As of 2021, only three firms are able to manufacture the most advanced semiconductors: TSMC of Taiwan, Samsung of South Korea, and Intel of the United States.  Part of this is due to the high capital costs of building foundries. TSMC's latest factory, capable of fabricating 3 nm process semiconductors and completed in 2020, cost $19.5 billion. 

Intel is considering outsourcing some production to TSMC.  It currently can only produce 10 nm semiconductors, while TSMC and Samsung can both produce 5 nm. GlobalFoundries, an American-headquartered firm, uses a 12 nm process for its most advanced chips due to the rapidly increasing development costs of smaller process nodes.

Semiconductor sales

Sales revenue

Market share

Largest companies 

Notes:
Pure-play foundries  They specialize in foundry services. They may or may not offer design services to third parties, as well as mask (photomask) making, semiconductor packaging and testing services, which can also be outsourced to other companies. An example is TSMC, which offers design, testing and packaging services, TCE phtomasks, which offers only mask making services, and ChipMOS, which offers only packaging and testing services.
IDMs (integrated device manufacturers)  They may or may not offer foundry services.
Fabless suppliers  They do not offer foundry services. They may or may not offer design services to third parties.

Device shipments

Integrated circuits

Discrete devices

Sales 
Manufacturers headquartered in the following places are the sales leaders in the pure-play foundry, IDM (integrated device manufacturing), fabless manufacturing and OSAT (outsourced semiconductor assembly and testing) sectors of the industry.

Note that manufacturers headquartered in the United States have fabrication plants across the world, including over 50% in the Americas, 39% in the Asia-Pacific region (including 9% in Japan), and 9% in Europe.

See also
Electronic design automation
List of semiconductor fabrication plants
Foundry model
Semiconductor consolidation
Semiconductor device fabrication
Semiconductor fabrication plant
Semiconductor Industry Association
Semiconductor industry in India
Semiconductor industry in Taiwan
Semiconductor industry in China
Transistor count

Notes

References

1960 introductions
Semiconductor device fabrication
Electronics industry
Industries (economics)

External links

 "The Silicon Age: Trends in Semiconductor Devices Industry", 2022